Salena Godden is an English poet, author, activist, broadcaster, memoirist and essayist.

Born in the UK, Salena Godden is of Jamaican-Irish heritage and based in London. Widely anthologised, she has published several books. She has also written for BBC TV and radio and has released four studio albums to date.

Biography
Her published books include poetry volumes Under The Pier (Nasty Little Press), Fishing in the Aftermath: Poems 1994–2014 (Burning Eye), and literary childhood memoir Springfield Road (Unbound Books).

Her latest publication, Pessimism Is For Lightweights – 13 pieces of Courage and Resistance, was published by Rough Trade Books in July 2018 in the first Rough Trade Editions series. The poem "Pessimism is for Lightweights" was a public poetry art piece on display outside the Arnolfini Gallery in Bristol for more than 18 months. The title of the poem was originally written by the author John Higgs as part of a talk he gave at the launch of the play Cosmic Trigger. Higgs later commissioned Godden to write the poem as part of the podcast to mark the publication of his book Watling Street.

Now in her third decade producing work, Godden is the author of powerful comic poetry anthems: My Tits Are More Feminist Than your Tits, Imagine If You Had To Lick It and Can't Be Bovvered. Throughout September 2019 her period-politics piece RED was included as an art installation for a women-led exhibition The Most Powerful Woman In The Universe curated by artist and painter Kelly-Anne Davitt at Gallery 46, Whitechapel.

Essays have included Shade published in award-winning anthology The Good Immigrant (Unbound) edited by Nikesh Shukla; Skin broadcast on The Essay, BBC Radio 3; We are The Champions published in Others (Unbound); And most recently Broken Biscuits edited by Sabrina Mahfouz and published in Smashing it! Working class artists on life, art and making it happen (Saqi).

Her first solo poetry album, LIVEwire was released in 2017/2018 on CD, vinyl 2LP and in print with indie spoken-word label Nymphs and Thugs. This work was shortlisted for the Ted Hughes Award. Godden's Live at Byline Festival EP was released October 2018 also with Nymphs and Thugs.

New work, the short film Is There Anybody Out There? (Back of the internet), was commissioned by Google and BBC Arts as part of their Rhyme and Reason BBC Arts programme, which aired in October 2019 and is currently on BBC Four, BBC iPlayer.

Her debut novel is Mrs Death Misses Death. A BBC Radio 4 documentary about the writing of Mrs Death Misses Death was broadcast throughout December 2018. The programme followed the work-in-progress over 12 months. The novel is described by the publisher, Canongate Books, as an "electrifying genre- and form-defying firestarter" and was published in January 2021. Mrs Death Misses Death has been longlisted for the Gordon Burn Prize, 2021.

Godden's live poetry performances include: March For Women, Trafalgar Square; HUH at the LSO with the London Symphony Orchestra; Superjam at the British Library with The Last Poets; the Stoke Newington Literary Festival; Festival of Debate with Helen Pankhurst; The Women's March, Parliament Square; Port Eliot Festival; Green Gathering; Curator of the LIVEwire stage and Poet Laureate at Byline Festival; The Women's Peace Council, Parliament Square; Edinburgh International Book Festival; Out-Spoken, The Purcell Room, Southbank; and Writers Rebellion, Trafalgar Square.

Godden is represented by OWN IT!, a literary, film and TV agency.

Film credits
Cahier Africain – a feature film documentary about the humanitarian crisis in Central Africa Republic produced by award-winning German director Heidi Specogna with English narration by Salena Godden. The film was awarded the Premio Zonta Club Locarno award by the jury of the Semaine de la critique - Locarno for its humanitarian value and the Silver Dove.

Brakes – premiered at the Edinburgh Film Festival, Brakes is an independent UK debut, a dark improvised comedy directed and written by Mercedes Grower. It stars Noel Fielding, Julia Davis and Julian Barratt and many familiar faces of British comedy. Its UK television premiere was on Film4 in 2018.

Radio highlights
BBC Radio 4 - Stir it up documentary
BBC Radio 4 - Little Miss Cornshucks documentary
BBC Radio 4 - A Valentine at Waterloo radio play
BBC Radio 3 - 'Skin' The Essay
BBC Radio 4 - Loose Ends with Clive Anderson
BBC Radio 3 - The Verb with Ian McMilan
BBC Radio 4 - Poetry Please with Roger McGough
BBC Radio 2 - Jonathan Ross Show
BBC Radio 4 - Mrs Death Mrs Death documentary
Soho Radio - Morning Glory with James Endeacott
BBC Radio 4xtra - Telling Tales
BBC Radio 4xtra - Comedy Club

Selected publishing: books and anthologies

Salena Godden books
2021: Mrs Death Misses Death - Canongate Books
 2018: Pessimism is for Lightweights - 13 pieces of courage and resistance - Rough Trade Books 
 2017: LIVEwire - album and book - Nymphs and Thugs
 2014: Springfield Road - a childhood memoir - Unbound Books
 2014: Fishing In The Aftermath Poems 1994–2014 - Burning Eye 
 2011: Under The Pier - Nasty Little Press

Poetry anthologies

 2020: "Galway Dreaming" - She Will Soar - Pan Macmilian 
 2020:  "It isn't pirate to seek permission" - HOW TO: Be More Pirate - OWN IT! 
2019: Poems For A Green and Blue Planet- Hachette Publishing
2019: Midnight Feasts  - Bloomsbury 
2019: What is Masculinity? Why does it matter? And other big questions - Hachette Publishing
2019: Eighty Four  - Verve Press
2018: The Dizziness of Freedom  - Bad Betty Press
2016: Untitled Two - Neu Reekie - Polygon Books
2013: Bang Said The Gun - Burning Eye
2012: Liminal Animal - Tongue Fu
2011: Raconteur - Parthian Books
2009: Dwang 1, 2 & 3 - Tangerine Press
2006: The Salzberg Review - Salzberg Review
2003: Velocity - Black Spring Press
2000: IC3 - New Black Writing - Penguin
1998: The Fire People - Payback Books / Canongate

Short fiction and essay anthologies
 2019: Smashing It: Working Class Artists on life, art and making it happen  - Saqi, Westbourne Press
 2019: Others  - Unbound Books, London
 2017: Bare Lit Anthology  - Brain Mill Press
 2016: The Good Immigrant - Unbound Books
 2016: The Unreliable Guide to London - Influx Press
 2013: Connecting Nothing With Something - Influx Press
 2012: Too Much Too Young Anthology - Bookslam
 2011: Sixty-Six Books - Oberon Books
 2010: MIR Review 7 - Birkbeck University
 2009: Punk Fiction - Portico
 2006: The Decadent Handbook - Dedalus Books
 2005: Croatian Nights - Serpent's Tail
 2004: Tell Tales - Tell Tales
 2001: Vox n Roll - Serpent's Tail

Discography
 2018: Salena Godden / Live at Byline Festival EP, Nymphs & Thugs
2017: Salena Godden / LIVEwire (live spoken word album), Nymphs and Thugs
 2007: Salena Godden/ Promise Of Gold TwoFive, Apples & Snakes
 2007: SaltPeter/ Hunger’s The Best Sauce album, FRED Records
 2007: SaltPeter/ I’m Not Gay But… EP, FRED Records
 2006: SaltPeter/ Everybody Back To Mine EP, FRED Records
 2006: Coldcut/ DVD, Ninja Tune Records
 2005: SaltPeter/ SaltPervert EP, Saltpetre Records: 
 2005: Alabama 3 feat Salena Saliva/Boots,	One Little Indian
 2004: Going Down Swinging/ compilation/Australia,	GDS
 2003: SaltPervert/5AM/single re-mix, OXYD Records.
 2003: Gargoyle Spoken Word CD/ compilation/USA, Gargoyle
 2003: Perfecto Presents...Seb Fontaine/ compilation, Perfecto
 2003: Flat Pack Antenna/ Resonance FM compilation, Resonance FM
 2000: SS&PC/ Egg Yolk Planet Fried debut album, Saltpetre Records
 1999: Saltpetre CD/Volume One, Saltpetre Records
 1999: Coldcut/Let Us Replay/ Virginia Epitome, Ninja Tune Records (credited as Salena Saliva)
 1997: Coldcut/Let Us Play/ Noah’s Toilet,	Ninja Tune Records (credited as Salena Saliva)

References

External links

Living people
English women poets
Black British women writers
Year of birth missing (living people)